Pristerognatha penthinana is a moth belonging to the family Tortricidae. The species was first described by Achille Guenée in 1845.

It is native to Eurasia.

References

Olethreutinae